Pennsylvania State Senate District 2 includes parts of Philadelphia County. It is currently represented by Democrat Christine M. Tartaglione.

District profile
The district includes the following areas:

Philadelphia County:

Ward 07
Ward 19 
Ward 23
Ward 25 [PART, Divisions 02, 03, 05, 06, 08, 09, 10, 11, 12, 13, 14, 15, 16, 17, 18, 19, 20, 21, 22, 23 and 24]
Ward 33
Ward 35 [PART, Divisions 01, 02, 03, 04, 05, 06, 07, 08, 12, 14, 15, 16, 17, 22, 23, 24, 26 and 32]
Ward 45
Ward 53
Ward 54
Ward 55
Ward 62

Senators

References

Pennsylvania Senate districts
Government of Philadelphia